{{Infobox airport
| name         = Mhangura Airport
| nativename   =
| nativename-a =
| nativename-r =
| image        =
| image-width  = 
| caption      =
| image2       =
| image2-width = 
| caption2     =
| IATA         =  
| ICAO         = FVGM
| FAA          = 
| TC           =
| LID          = FV77
| GPS          =
| WMO          =
| type         = Public (abandoned)
| owner-oper   =
| owner        =
| operator     =
| city-served  = Mhangura, Zimbabwe
| location     =
| hub          =
| built        = 
| used         = 
| commander    = 
| occupants    = 
| elevation-f  = 4080
| elevation-m  = 
| metric-elev  =
| coordinates  = 
| website                =
| image_map              =
| image_mapsize          =
| image_map_alt          =
| image_map_caption      =
| pushpin_map            = Zimbabwe
| pushpin_mapsize        =
| pushpin_map_alt        =
| pushpin_map_caption    = Location of the airport in Zimbabwe
| pushpin_image          =
| pushpin_label          = FVGM''
| pushpin_label_position =
| r1-number    = Closed
| r1-length-f  = 
| r1-length-m  = 
| r1-surface   = 
| metric-rwy   =
| h1-number    =
| h1-length-f  =
| h1-length-m  =
| h1-surface   = 
| stat1-header =
| stat1-data   = 
| stat-year    =
| footnotes    = Sources: Google Maps, OpenStreetMap
}}Mhangura Airport'''  was an airstrip serving Mhangura, in Mashonaland West Province, Zimbabwe. Aerial views show the airstrip is abandoned, with trees growing on the former dirt runway.

See also
List of airports in Zimbabwe
Transport in Zimbabwe

References

External links
OpenStreetMap - Mhangura
Bing Maps - Mhangura Airport

Defunct airports
Airports in Zimbabwe
Buildings and structures in Mashonaland West Province